A bottomry, or bottomage, is an arrangement in which the master of a ship borrows money upon the bottom or keel of it, so as to forfeit the ship itself to the creditor, if the money with interest is not paid at the time appointed at the ship's safe return.

This occurs, for example, where the ship needs urgent repairs during the course of its voyage or some other emergency arises and it is not possible for the master to contact the owner to arrange funds, allowing the master to borrow money on the security of the ship or the cargo by executing a bond. Where the ship is hypothecated, the bond is called a bottomry bond. Where both the ship and its cargo are hypothecated, the relationship is called respondentia.  Due to the bottomry bond's relatively low priority as against other liens in the event of a libel against the ship, the use of bottomry bonds declined greatly in the 19th century and the subject is today of interest only to legal historians.

The Code of Hammurabi describes a form of bottomry which is a risk transferring technique. A bottomry would be taken, but the repayment would be contingent on the ship successfully completing the voyage. This is more like a catastrophe bond than traditional insurance. In traditional insurance, you pay premiums and receive a benefit on the risk event. With bottomry and catastrophe bonds, you receive a loan up front and only pay it back with a premium if the risk event doesn't occur.

In his Life of Cato the Elder, Plutarch describes how he would use the process to make money, but calls it "the most disreputable form of money-lending".  Kaplan and Kaplan describe it as follows:

Respondentia
Respondentia is a loan where a ship's cargo is the security, on similar terms to bottomry.

See also
Hypothec
Mortgage
Security interest
Mechanic's lien

References

Further reading
 This contains a detailed discussion of the contract and its history.

Credit
Marine insurance
Admiralty law
Loans
Mortgage